The 2018–19 MSV Duisburg season was the 119th season in the club's football history. In 2018–19 the club played in the 2. Bundesliga, the second tier of German football.

With a loss on 12 May 2019, Duisburg was relegated to the 3. Liga.

Team

Transfers

In

Out

New contracts

Friendlies

Results
Times from 1 July to 27 October 2018 and from 31 March to 30 June 2019 are UTC+2, from 28 October 2018 to 30 March 2019 UTC+1.

Overview

2. Bundesliga

League table

Results summary

Result round by round

Matches

DFB-Pokal

Statistics

Squad statistics

† Players who left the club mid-season.

Goals

Clean sheets

Disciplinary record

References

External links

German football clubs 2018–19 season
MSV Duisburg seasons